The 2012 Miami-Dade County mayoral election took place on August 14, 2012. Incumbent Mayor Carlos A. Giménez defeated County Commissioner Joe Martinez with over 50% of the vote, avoiding a November 6 runoff. The election was officially nonpartisan.

Candidates 
 Edna Diaz, (Independent)
 Carlos A. Giménez, incumbent mayor of Miami-Dade County (Republican)
 Gary Delano Johnson, (Democratic)
 Farid Khavari, economist and gubernatorial candidate in 2010 (Democratic)
 Joe Martinez, Miami-Dade County commissioner (Republican)
 Helen B. Williams, Miami-Dade County Public Schools administrator (Independent) 2008 candidate for Mayor
 Denny Wood, activist (Independent)

Results

References

Mayoral elections in Miami-Dade County, Florida
2012 Florida elections
Miami-Dade